Kritik was a Danish language bimonthly cultural magazine with a special reference to literature, which was based in Copenhagen, Denmark. It existed between 1967 and 2016.

History and profile
Kritik was established in 1967. The founders were Aage Henriksen and Johan Fjord Jensen. The magazine mostly featured articles on literary criticism.

Kritik, based in Copenhagen, was published on a bimonthly basis by Gyldendal.

Throughout its existence the editorial stance of Kritik changed. In the 1970s the magazine tried to offer Marxism-oriented approach towards the understanding of literature. In the 1980s it heavily engaged in cultural criticism. During the 1990s its main focus was on art and philosophy. Kritik ended publication in 2016.

References

External links
 Official website

1967 establishments in Denmark
2016 disestablishments in Denmark
Bi-monthly magazines published in Denmark
Danish-language magazines
Defunct literary magazines published in Europe
Defunct magazines published in Denmark
Literary magazines published in Denmark
Magazines established in 1967
Magazines disestablished in 2016
Magazines published in Copenhagen
Marxist magazines
Philosophy magazines
Political magazines published in Denmark
Defunct political magazines
Literary criticism